The 2009 English cricket season was the 110th in which the County Championship had been an official competition. Four regular tournaments were played: The LV County Championship (first-class), Friends Provident Trophy (50 Over), NatWest Pro40 League (40 Over) and the Twenty20 Cup (T20). All four tournaments featured the eighteen classic county cricket teams, although the Friends Provident Trophy also featured sides from Ireland and Scotland.

On the international scene England hosted the 2009 ICC World Twenty20. Australia toured England to compete for the Ashes; it was the 74th test series between the two sides with England winning 2-1. The West Indies also toured losing the Wisden Trophy test series 2-0 to England.

Test Series

Ashes

Wisden Trophy

ICC World Twenty20

LV County Championship

Friends Provident Trophy

Natwest Pro40

Twenty20 Cup

Other winners
Minor Counties Championship - Buckinghamshire
MCCA Knockout Trophy - Norfolk

References

External links
 2009 English cricket season from Cricinfo

 
2009 in cricket
Cricket season
 2009